Mahala is a village in the municipality of Podgorica, Montenegro.

Demographics
According to the 2003 census, the village has a population of 1,235 people.

According to the 2011 census, its population was 1,346.

References

Populated places in Podgorica Municipality